Sossobé is a village and seat of the commune of Togoro Kotia in the Cercle of Ténenkou in the Mopti Region of southern-central Mali. The village lies in the Inner Niger Delta and between July and December is only accessible by boat.

References

Populated places in Mopti Region